Anglefort is a commune in the department of Ain in the Auvergne-Rhône-Alpes region of eastern France.

Geography

Anglefort is a commune in Bugey on the right bank of the Rhone at the foot of the mountain of Grand Colombier which has a panorama of the Alps and the Jura mountains.

The commune is located 25 km south of Bellegarde-sur-Valserine and 30 km north by north-west of Aix-les-Bains. Access to the commune is by road D992 from Seyssel in the north passing through the length of the commune and the village to Culoz in the south.  There is also access on road D120 which is a highly circuitous route from Lochieu in the west continuing to the village as the D120A and continuing south through the Col du Grand Colombier (1,501m) to Culoz.  A railway line passes through the commune from north to south with a station to the east of the village.

The Rhône river runs south along the eastern border of the commune and Le Verdet stream flows from the north to the south of the commune into the Rhone.

Environment
The alluvial aquifer fed by the Rhone is threatened by an internal discharge created by the Pechiney Group. Foundry waste, metal dust, and recovered acid from filters have been buried in the Chautagnard marsh with a probable contamination by heavy metals and arsenic.

History
The Priory of Anglefort was located on the communal territory in the Middle Ages. In 1590 Guillaume Drujon was a priest and he became abbot in 1620.

Administration

List of mayors of Anglefort

Population

Economy
The Électricité de France (EDF) Dam is on the Rhone river in the territory of the commune and there is a factory producing silicon. Formerly the property of the Pechiney Electro-metallurgy group, the factory has passed successively into the hands of Alcan (Canada), and the Anglo-Australian Rio Tinto at the whim of successive buy-backs of this former French industrial flagship.

Sights
Two sites are registered as historical monuments in the commune:
The old Chateau of Anglefort (18th century) formerly the seat of the Lordship of Anglefort and rebuilt in 1741.
The Chateau of Mieugy Park
 The remains of the Chateau de la Rochette which dominates the Rhone was the seat of the Lordship of Rochette, mentioned in 1407.

Personalities
 Monseigneur Jacques-François Besson, born in Mieugy, Bishop of Metz from 1824 to 1842

See also
 Communes of the Ain department

References

External links
Anglefort on Géoportail, National Geographic Institute (IGN) website 
Anglefort on the 1750 Cassini Map

Communes of Ain